This was the first edition of the tournament.

Mateus Alves and Gustavo Heide won the title after defeating Luciano Darderi and Genaro Alberto Olivieri 6–3, 6–3 in the final.

Seeds

Draw

References

External links
 Main draw

Aberto da República - Men's Doubles